Aprominta bifasciata is a moth in the family Autostichidae. It is found in Greece and Turkey.

References

Moths described in 1870
Aprominta
Moths of Europe
Moths of Asia